Golden Island may refer to:

 An early name for the Golden Chersonese, the Malay peninsula
 Golden Island Shopping Centre, a shopping center in Ireland
 An island in Whidbey Isles Conservation Park, South Australia
 A former name of Nijhum Dwip, Hatiya, Bangladesh
 An alternate name for Ponnumthuruthu, Kerala, India
 The main setting of the video game Angry Birds Stella
 A brand of beef jerky acquired by Jack Link's Beef Jerky

See also
 Goldenisland